Barari Assembly constituency is an assembly constituency in Katihar district in the Indian state of Bihar.It is located near the banks of Kosi river. Nearest railway station is Karhagola Road. Laxmipur aitihashik gurudwara is also located here.

Overview
As per Delimitation of Parliamentary and Assembly constituencies Order, 2008, No 68. Barari Assembly constituency is composed of the following: Barari, Sameli and Kursela community development blocks.

Barari Assembly constituency is part of No 11 Katihar (Lok Sabha constituency).

Members of Legislative Assembly

Election Results

2020

References

External links
 

Assembly constituencies of Bihar
Politics of Katihar district